In linguistics, converses or relational antonyms are pairs of words that refer to a relationship from opposite points of view, such as parent/child or borrow/lend. The relationship between such words is called a converse relation. Converses can be understood as a pair of words where one word implies a relationship between two objects, while the other implies the existence of the same relationship when the objects are reversed.  Converses are sometimes referred to as complementary antonyms because an "either/or" relationship is present between them. One exists only because the other exists.

List of converse words
 Own and belong are relational opposites i.e. "A owns B" is the same as "B belongs to A." 
 Win and lose i.e. if someone wins, someone must lose.
 Fraction and whole i.e. if there is a fraction, there must be a whole.
 Above and below
 Employer and employee
 Parent and child
 Teacher and student
 Buy and sell
 East and west
 Husband and wife
 Predator and prey
 Lend and borrow
 Offense and defense
 Slave and master

See also
Opposite (semantics)

References

Semantics
Dichotomies